The 1974 Oregon State Beavers football team represented Oregon State University in the Pacific-8 Conference (Pac-8) during the 1974 NCAA Division I football season. In their tenth season under head coach Dee Andros, the Beavers compiled a 3–8 record (3–4 in Pac-8, tied for fifth), and were outscored 275 to 216. They played their four home games on campus at Parker Stadium in Corvallis.

With their 35–16 win over rival Oregon in the season finale, Andros' record improved to 9–1 over the Ducks in the Civil War game.

Schedule

Roster
QB Alvin White

References

External links
 Game program: Oregon State at Washington State – November 9, 1974

Oregon State
Oregon State Beavers football seasons
Oregon State Beavers football